The Fast Track High Court is one of the Senior Courts in Ghana

Unconstitutionality
Ghana's Supreme Court declared the Fast Track Court Unconstitutional following a suit brought against it by Mr. Tsatsu Tsikata.In a 5–4 decision, the Supreme Court has ruled the Fast Track Court, created by the NPP government, was illegal.

Constitutionality
On 26 June 2002, the Supreme Court (SC) declared the Fast Track High Court constitutional.

See also
Judiciary of Ghana
Supreme Court of Ghana

References

Judiciary of Ghana